Rachel de Haze (born 29 January 1991) is a former Dutch handballer who played for Succes Schoonmaak/VOC Amsterdam, from 2009 to 2020.

Achievements
Dutch Division:
Winner: 2010, 2017, 2018, 2019
Dutch Cup:
Winner: 2010, 2016
Dutch Supercup:
Winner: 2010, 2016
EHF Youth European Championship:
Bronze Medalist: 2007

Personal life
She is the granddaughter of Rinus Israël.

References

1991 births
Living people
Sportspeople from Amsterdam
Dutch female handball players
21st-century Dutch women